The 1997 Masters (officially the 1997 Benson & Hedges Masters) was a professional non-ranking snooker tournament that took place between 2 and 9 February 1997 at the Wembley Conference Centre in London, England.

Steve Davis won his third Masters title, nine years after his last win in 1988, by defeating Ronnie O'Sullivan in the final. O'Sullivan, who was playing in his third consecutive Masters final, took an 8–4 lead before Davis came back to win six successive frames and clinch the title with a 10–8 victory.

The final was notable for featuring snooker's first ever streaker, 22-year-old secretary Lianne Crofts, who invaded the playing area at the beginning of the third frame. After stewards removed her from the arena, O'Sullivan amused the crowd by comically wiping the brow of veteran referee John Street, who was refereeing his final match of his career.

The wild-card players included Paul Hunter, who would later go on to win 3 Masters titles in 4 years between 2001 and 2004. The highest break of the tournament was 130 made by Steve Davis.

Field
Stephen Hendry, defending champion and World Champion was the number 1 seed. Places were allocated to the top 16 players in the world rankings. Players seeded 15 and 16 played in the wild-card round against the winner of the qualifying event, Brian Morgan (ranked 49), and Paul Hunter (ranked 78), who was the wild-card selection. Paul Hunter and Brian Morgan were making their debuts in the Masters.

Prize fund 
The breakdown of prize money for this year is shown below:
 Winner: £135,000
 Runner-up: £70,000
 High Break Prize: £15,000

Wild-card round
In the preliminary round, the qualifier and wild-card players played the 15th and 16th seeds:

Main draw

Final

Qualifying
Brian Morgan won the qualifying tournament, known as the 1996 Benson & Hedges Championship at the time.

Century breaks 
Total: 10
 130  Steve Davis
 121, 116, 113, 108  Ronnie O'Sullivan
 115  Mark Williams
 109  Nigel Bond
 109  Peter Ebdon
 108  Brian Morgan
 104  Ken Doherty

Brian Morgan's century was scored in the wild-card round.

References

Masters (snooker)
Masters (snooker)
Masters (snooker)
Masters (snooker)
February 1997 sports events in the United Kingdom